Bouquehault is a commune in the Pas-de-Calais department in the Hauts-de-France region in northern France.

Geography
A farming village located 10 miles (16 km) south of Calais, on the D248 road.

Population

Sights
 The church of St. Omer, dating from the sixteenth century.
 The nineteenth centuryChâteau de Dippendal.
 The remains of an old château.
 A ruined windmill, built in 1868.

See also
Communes of the Pas-de-Calais department

References

Communes of Pas-de-Calais